Our Town is a 2003 American made-for-television film adaptation of the 1938 play of the same name by Thornton Wilder starring Paul Newman, who was nominated for both an Emmy Award and a Screen Actors Guild Award for outstanding acting. It was filmed at the Booth Theatre in Manhattan, where it played on Broadway in 2002. The production originated at the Westport Country Playhouse. The film originally aired May 24, 2003 on Showtime and was also shown on PBS as part of Masterpiece Theatre on October 5, 2003.

Plot summary

Cast 
 Jayne Atkinson as Mrs. Gibbs
 Wendy Barrie-Wilson as Woman in Balcony
 Reathel Bean as Man in Auditorium
 John Braden as Professor Willard
 Tom Brennan as Joe Stoddard
 Kieran Campion as Baseball Player
 Patch Darragh as Baseball Player
 Frank Converse as Dr. Gibbs
 Jane Curtin as Mrs. Webb
 Jeffrey DeMunn as Mr. Webb
 Mia Dillon as Mrs. Soames
 Conor Donovan as Wally Webb
 Ben Fox as George Gibbs
 Kristen Hahn as Rebecca Gibbs
 Carter Jackson as Sam Craig
 Maggie Lacey as Emily Webb
 Stephen Mendillo as Constable Warren
 Paul Newman as Stage Manager
 Stephen Spinella as Simon Stimson
 T.J. Sullivan as Joe Crowell
 Jake Robards as Howie Newsome
 Cynthia Wallace as Woman in Auditorium
 Travis Walters as Si Crowell

Awards 
 Emmy Nomination (2003): Outstanding Lead Actor in a Miniseries or a Movie (Paul Newman)
 Golden Satellite Award Nominations (2004):
 Best Motion Picture Made for Television
 Best Performance by an Actress in a Supporting Role in a Miniseries or a Motion Picture Made for Television (Jayne Atkinson)
 Best Performance by an Actress in a Supporting Role in a Miniseries or a Motion Picture Made for Television (Jane Curtin)
 Screen Actors Guild Award Nomination (2004): Outstanding Performance by a Male Actor in a Television Movie or Miniseries (Paul Newman)

External links 
 Our Town on the Official PBS website
 
 
 

2003 television films
2003 films
2003 drama films
American films based on plays
Films set in New Hampshire
Filmed stage productions
Showtime (TV network) films
PBS original programming
American drama television films
2000s American films